Berri is a city in the Riverland region of South Australia. It is 238 kilometres north-east of Adelaide, the capital of the state of South Australia and a few kilometres west of the SA-Victoria border. It is primarily an agricultural and viticultural city on the north bank of the Murray River. It is the original home of a juice company, Berri Ltd.

History
The name "Berri" is from the local Aboriginal tribe, Meri, meaning "a wide bend in the river". The area was first explored by European settlers when Charles Sturt navigated the Murray River. Its first impetus for settlement came when paddle steamers came down the River Murray and a refuelling stop was developed. This was to become Berri. The area was also part of Cobdogla Station pastoral run before it was broken up for closer farming.

In 1910, irrigation was established and Berri was proclaimed as a town in 1911. Irrigation subsequently led to the establishment of vineyards and fruit orchards (such as citrus, apricots and peaches). A distillery was established in 1918 and rail arrived in 1928. In 1943,  "Berri Juices" (Berri Ltd) were first produced. By the 1950s, Berri and other Riverland towns dominated the local economy with fruit and their products.

Transport from one side of the Murray to the other consisted of two parallel ferries. These were replaced by a bridge in 1997 which was opened by the Premier of South Australia, John Olsen. It is the largest of its type in South Australia. It was estimated that 10,000 people attended the official opening on 27 July 1997. The bridge cost $17 million after 30 years of lobbying. The bridge spans the Murray River between Berri and Loxton.

Geography and Climate
Berri exists in a semi-arid location, north of Goyder's Line. Berri is surrounded by mallee scrub. Berri is also near Renmark and Mildura. It is 31 metres above sea level.

Berri experiences a cold semi-arid climate (Köppen climate classification: BSk), Trewartha: BSal); with warm, dry summers; mild, dry springs and autumns; and mild, relatively dry winters.
Due to its inland location, summers and winters are drier and more prone to extremes than Adelaide's seasons. The average winter daily maximum temperature is 15.5 °C in July and the average summer daily maximum temperature is 31.1 °C in January. Average rainfall of Berri is 261.7 millimetres. The weather patterns are similar to those of Adelaide.

Berri today
Berri is a multicultural town with a café and a hotel on the riverside, a main street that overlooks the river and other shopping facilities elsewhere in the town, such as the Riverland Plaza.

The Berri Visitors Centre shares a spot on the waterfront at the bottom of Vaughan Terrace with River Jacks cafe. This is a popular gathering point for Berri professionals and tourists alike, not undue to its waterfront location, alfresco dining and proximity to the visitors centre itself.

The river itself offers fishing, waterskiing and boating. A boat launching marina is located opposite the Berri caravan park on the waterfront. The Martin's Bend wetland offers educational walk and water sports. Nearby is the "Katarapko" section of the Murray River National Park which is a popular area for camping, birdwatching, canoeing and bushwalking.

A past local tourist attraction was the Big Orange, it offered a three-storey high observation deck over the plains and river. The facility also offered souvenirs, refreshments and local produce. It opened in 1980 and closed to visitors in 2004. Development ideas for the future of the site included an orchid nursery, waterfall, butterfly house, tropical garden and bird cages.

Horticulture, in particular oranges and grapes is still strong in the area. Berri is situated in an area of 3000 hectares of irrigated fruit orchards. Secondary industries include fruit packing, fruit juice, and wine.

Other events held in Berri are the annual Riverland Wine and Food Festival and Tour of Riverland Cycling.

Art and culture
The Country Arts SA River Lands Gallery in Berri has a new exhibition each month, with touring visual arts shows and Riverland based artists.

Berri also has public art work, like the Riverland Vietnam & Post WWII veteran's war memorial, the Aboriginal dreamtime mural underneath the Berri Bridge, and Jimmy James Memorial on the Berri riverfront.

Jimmy James was a famous blacktracker, who was born around 1910 and belonged to the Pitjantjatjara people. He moved to the Riverland in the 1940s and took his name from his equally famous father-in-law. He was used extensively by the Police in South Australia, Victoria, New South Wales and Northern Territory, to track felons, escapees and missing people. A monument is sculptured out of two slabs of finely polished black granite and engraved with images of birds and animals – a part of Jimmy's spirit world.

Media
Berri was home to a community newspaper, the Berri Community News (3 October 1951 – 19 April 1962), which was later released as Berri News (9 May 1962 – 30 January 1963), subtitled with which is incorporated "the Berri community news". The publication, issued by Berri War Memorial Community Centre Incorporated, concentrated on news and events from Berri, Glossop, Monash, and Winkie.

Channels from the following television networks are available in Berri:
 ABC Television (ABC)
 SBS Television (SBS) 
 WIN Television (7, 9 & 10) as RTS-5A & LRS-34 relays the programming from Seven Network (Seven SA), Nine Network (Nine SA) & Network Ten (10 SA), Sky News Regional and Fox Sports News, with local commercials inserted

Berri is also home to radio stations Magic 93.1 and 5RM.

Governance
Berri is in the Berri Barmera Council local government area. It is in the state electorate of Chaffey and the federal Division of Barker.

Born in Berri
 Russell Ebert, champion Australian rules footballer
 Rhys Stanley, AFL player with Geelong Football Club
 Luke Saville, professional tennis player
 Kate Morton, author
 Kaiden Brand, Australian Football League
Alexander Hill, world champion rower
 Ron Battams, Australian rules football played with St Kilda Football Club
 Anas Berri, Moroccan Golf Player

Notable residents
Archie Roach, singer/songwriter
Ruby Hunter, singer/songwriter
Hayden Stoeckel, Local swimmer

See also
 Murray River Crossings
 South Australian food and drink

References

External links

The Age travelguide – Berri
Berri – Bookmark Biosphere

Towns in South Australia
Populated places on the Murray River
Riverland